Odesa Oblast Football Federation is a football governing body in the region of Odesa Oblast, Ukraine. The federation is a member of the Regional Council of FFU and the collective member of the FFU itself.

Previous champions

1951    Zhovtnevyi Raion
1952    FC Chervonyi Prapor Odesa
1953    FC Shakhtar Odesa
1954    FC Shakhtar Odesa (2)
1955    FC Metalurh Odesa
1956    FC Metalurh Odesa (2)
1957    FC Vodnyk Kiliya
1958    FC Vodnyk Kiliya (2)
1959    FC Lokomotyv Kotovsk
1960    FC Dunayets Izmail
1961    SKA Odesa
1962    SKA Odesa (2)
1963    FC Torpedo Odesa
1964    FC Avtomobilist Odesa
1965    FC Torpedo Odesa (2)
1966    FC Spartak (Avtomobilist) Odesa
1967    FC Povstannia Tatarbunary
1968    FC Povstannia Tatarbunary (2)
1969    FC Povstannia Tatarbunary (3)
1970    FC Povstannia Tatarbunary (4)
1971    FC Portovyk Illichivsk
1972    FC Portovyk Illichivsk (2)
1973    FC Portovyk Illichivsk (3)
1974    FC Torpedo Odesa (3)
1975    FC Portovyk Illichivsk (4)
1976    FC Povstannia Tatarbunary (5)
1977    FC Portovyk Illichivsk (5)
1978    FC Factory of October Revolution Odesa
1979    FC Portovyk Illichivsk (6)
1980    FC Dzerzhynets Ovidiopol
1981    FC Dzerzhynets Ovidiopol (2)
1982    FC Taksi Odesa
1983    FC Sudnoremontnyk Illichivsk
1984    FC Factory of October Revolution Odesa (2)
1985    FC Dynamo Odesa
1986    FC Dynamo Odesa (2)
1987    FC Factory of October Revolution Odesa (3)
1988    FC Sudnoremontnyk Illichivsk
1989    FC Sudnoremontnyk Illichivsk (2)
1990    FC Torpedo Odesa (4)
1991    FC Dnister Ovidiopol (3)
1992    FC Blaho Blahoyeve
1992-93 FC Blaho Blahoyeve (2)
1993-94 FC Ren Reni
1994-95 FC Pervomayets Pershotravneve
1995-96 FC Blaho Blahoyeve (3)
1996-97 FC Lotto-GCM Odesa
1997-98 FC Dnister Ovidiopol (4)
1998-99 FC Dnister Ovidiopol (5)
1999-00 FC Dnister Ovidiopol (6)
2000    FC Dnister Ovidiopol (7)
2001    FC Tyras-2500 Bilhorod-Dnistrovskyi
2002    FC Tyras-2500 Bilhorod-Dnistrovskyi (2)
2003    FC Bilyayivka
2004    FC Tyras-2500 Bilhorod-Dnistrovskyi (3)
2005    FC Tyras-2500 Bilhorod-Dnistrovskyi (4)
2006    FC Tyras-2500 Bilhorod-Dnistrovskyi (5)
2007    FC Bryz (Dunayets) Izmail
2008    FC Bilyayivka (2)
2009    FC Tarutyne
2010    FC Tarutyne (2)
2011    FC Sovignon Tayirove
2012    FC Bessarabia Odesa
2013    FC Balkany Zorya
2014    FC Yeremiivka
2015    FC Yeremiivka (2)
2016    FC Khadzhybei Usatove
2017    FC Olimp Lyukseon Krynychky
2018    FC Imeni V.Z.Tura Dmytrivka
2019    FC Imeni V.Z.Tura Dmytrivka (2)

Top winners
 7 – FC Dnister (Dzerzhynets) Ovidiopol
 6 – FC Portovyk Illichivsk
 5 – FC Povstannia Tatarbunary
 5 – FC Tyras-2500 Bilhorod-Dnistrovskyi
 4 – FC Torpedo Odesa
 3 – 3 clubs (Factory of October Revolution, Sudnoremontnyk, Blaho)
 2 – 11 clubs
 1 – 12 clubs

Professional clubs
 FC Dynamo Odessa, 1936–1939, 1946
 FC Pischevik Odessa, 1940, 1945–1950, 1955-1957
 FC Spartak Odessa, 1941
 FC Spartak Izmail (representing Izmail Oblast), 1946
 FC Metallurg Odessa, 1953-1954
 SC Odesa (SKVO, SKA), 1958-1999 --> FC Chornomorets-2 Odesa
 FC Chornomorets Odesa, 1958-
 FC Chornomorets-2 Odesa, 1992-1995, 1999-2004, 2010-2012
 FC Dunaets Izmail, 1964-1967
 FC Avtomobilist Odessa, 1965-1966

See also
 FFU Council of Regions

References

External links
 Odesa Oblast Football Federation

Football in the regions of Ukraine
Football governing bodies in Ukraine
Sport in Odesa Oblast